Georg von Schnurbein (born 1977, Regen) is associate professor of foundation management at the University of Basel.  He is also the founder of the Center for Philanthropy Studies (CEPS) at the university.

Education 
From 1998 to 2003 Schnurbein studied business administration at the Otto-Friedrich-Universität Bamberg, then at the University of Fribourg; and political science at the University of Bern. In 2007, he earned a PhD from the University of Fribourg, Switzerland, and in 2013 and completed his Habilitation at the Wirtschaftsuniversität Wien.

Professional career 
In 2008, aligned with the foundation of the Center for Philanthropy Studies (CEPS), Schnurbein was appointed to assistant professor of foundation management at the faculty of business and economics at the University of Basel. In 2014 he was appointed as associate professor for foundation management.

Research Focus 
Schnurbein  publishes in the areas of Nonprofit Management, foundation management, measuring impact, charity monitoring, financing of non profit organisations, and of philanthropy in general.

Some of his publications include:
 "Benefits and Drivers of Nonprofit Revenue Concentration", in: Nonprofit and Voluntary Sector Quarterly, Vol. 46, Nr. 5, 2018, S. 922–943 (with Tizian Fritz)
 "Finanzierung und Wachstum von Nonprofit-Organisationen", in: Die Unternehmung, Jg. 71, Nr. 2, 2017, S. 147–164.
 Swiss Foundation Code 2015, Foundation Governance Bd. 11, Basel: Helbing Lichtenhahn, 2015 (together with Thomas Sprecher and Philipp Egger)
 Die Förderstiftung: Strategie – Führung – Management, Foundation Governance Bd. 7, 2. Aufl., Basel: Helbing Lichtenhahn, 2015 (with Karsten Timmer)
 "Organizational factors affecting volunteers: a literature review on volunteer coordination", in: Voluntas, available online, 2012 (with Sibylle Studer)

Editor and Expert 
Schnurbein is co-editor of the Swiss foundation report, published yearly, as well as the Swiss Foundation Code 2015. He serves as member on committees of various scientific journals, like Nonprofit Management & Leadership, Voluntary Sector Review, as well as 
Global Perspectives on Philanthropy and Public Good Series.

References

External links 
Georg von Schnurbein an der Universität Basel
Center for Philanthropy Studies (CEPS) der Universität Basel
Literatur von Georg von Schnurbein im Katalog der Deutschen Nationalbibliothek

Academic staff of the University of Basel
1977 births
Living people
People from Regen (district)